Armenian Sign Language is the deaf sign language of Armenia.

Classification
Wittmann (1991) posits that ArSL is a language isolate (a 'prototype' sign language).

See also

 Armenian language
 Caucasian Sign Language
 Deafness
 Languages of Armenia
 Languages of Europe
 List of sign languages
 Sign language

References

Languages of Armenia
Sign language isolates
Sign languages